William Malet  may refer to:

 William Malet (companion of William the Conqueror) (died 1071), Norman lord who fought in the Battle of Hastings
 William Malet (exile) (died c. 1121), Norman lord who forfeited his English lands and was banished from England
 William Malet (Magna Carta baron) (fl. 1195–1215), guarantor of Magna Carta

See also
Billy Mallett, Coronation Street character